Bata Spasojević is a fashion designer from Serbia. He designs both men's and womenswear.

Background
His work has been displayed at the Master Centre in Novi Sad. He is a recipient of the best male collection at the Serbia Fashion Award.

In 2011, his Matrix-like futuristic garments (trench coats and pants with an excess of zippers) were on display at the Miami Beach International Fashion Week.  According to Sun-Sentinel reporter Joanie Cox, the garments were a little bit too futuristic for the men of today. He opened the 34th Belgrade Fashion Week in late March 2014.

In February 2016, his work was displayed at the DC Fashion Week, held in Washington DC. In September 2016, Elucid Magazine showed his collection at the World Fashion Parade.

References

Serbian fashion designers
Living people
Menswear designers
Year of birth missing (living people)